Drobytsky Yar is a ravine in Kharkiv, Ukraine. In December 1941, Nazi troops invading the Soviet Union began killing local residents over the following year. At the end of this period, some 16,000 people, mainly Jews, were killed. Children were thrown into pits alive, to save bullets, in the expectation that they would quickly freeze to death. The site's menorah monument was smashed by Russian military forces on March 26, 2022.

Memorial
In the beginning of the 1990s, a competition was held for the best design of the memorial to immortalize the thousands of citizens who perished at the hands of the Nazis. Twenty-nine designs were submitted. The winner was the architect A. Leibfreid. The construction of the complex lasted several years however it was suspended due to the lack of funds.

At a meeting in late August 2001, the Kharkiv Oblast administration decided to resume the construction of the memorial. The oblast authorities supervised the construction process. The Cabinet of Ministers of Ukraine allotted 600,000 hryvnas for the construction. Contributions have also been made by city and oblast administrations, as well as by sponsors.

On 13 December 2002 the President of Ukraine, Leonid Kuchma, opened the memorial.

The main part of the memorial is a monument symbolizing a synagogue, with the Ten Commandments between its columns; most notably: "Do not kill". The memorial begins with a monument stylized under a Jewish menorah. A road leads from a black menorah to a white main building of the complex. Thousands of Kharkiv Jews took their last steps along it in 1941/1942. These dates are found on the wall of the main arched building. Underground is a hall of memory; the wall will bear the names of the victims who are known to have died.

The site includes two burials area. One trench is 100 m long and the other is 60 m. The Kharkiv archives contain data on fifteen thousand victims. However, the "Drobytsky Yar" foundation considers the number of dead to be closer to thirty thousand.

180 tons of a Zhytomyr granite was used in the construction of the memorial.  This is the same material that was used for Lenin's Mausoleum. Due to the granite's particular qualities (it has reddish veins), the stones lying at the menorah's foot seem to bleed.

As of 2006 the names of 4,300 of the 16,000 victims were etched on an underground memorial wall, illuminated by candlelight, in a room called "Room of Tragedy".

On 26 March 2022, during the second Russian invasion of Ukraine, it was reported that Russian artillery fire had damaged the menorah sculpture. The claim that Russian forces damaged the menorah sculpture was accepted by not only Ukrainian government officials, but also by Ukraine’s embassy in Israel and Israel’s Ambassador to Ukraine Michael Brodsky.

Museum

On 27 January 2002 a new exposition in the Kharkiv City Holocaust Museum was officially opened. The exposition was created in December 2001, when Kharkiv commemorated the 60th anniversary of the Drobytsky Yar tragedy. Excursions to the ravine had already been held before, but the official opening was on 27 January, the anniversary of the Auschwitz-Birkenau concentration camp's 1945 liberation (later designated International Holocaust Remembrance Day). Six candles were lit in memory of the six million Jews murdered in the Holocaust.

Gallery

References

External links

 Official website of the memorial complex "Drobitsky Yar"
Kharkov Charitable fund "to Victims of Holocaust in Drobitskiy Yar"
Memorial information

History of Kharkiv
Jews and Judaism in Kharkiv
Mass murder in 1941
Geography of Kharkiv Oblast
Massacres in Ukraine
World War II sites in Ukraine
World War II sites of Nazi Germany
World War II memorials in Ukraine
Buildings and structures in Kharkiv Oblast
Tourist attractions in Kharkiv Oblast
Holocaust locations in Ukraine
Holocaust massacres and pogroms in Ukraine
Buildings and structures destroyed during the 2022 Russian invasion of Ukraine